Checkered skipper, checkered-skipper, or chequered skipper may refer to a variety of butterflies in the family Hesperiidae:

 Carterocephalus, a Holarctic genus of subfamily Heteropterinae that may be known as "chequered skippers" in Europe
 Carterocephalus palaemon, a species commonly known as just "checquered skipper" in Europe
 Large chequered skipper, a Palearctic species
 Pyrgus, a genus of subfamily Pyrginae, some species of which are known as "checkered" or "chequered skippers" in North America
 Burnsius, a genus formerly included in Pyrgus that also includes many species known as "checkered skippers" in North America
 Kedestes lepenula, an African species commonly known as just "chequered skipper"

Animal common name disambiguation pages